Anton Andreyevich Miranchuk (born 17 October 1995) is a Russian professional footballer who plays as a left winger or attacking midfielder for Lokomotiv Moscow and the Russia national team.

Club career

Youth career
Born in Slavyansk-na-Kubani, Miranchuk joined Spartak Moscow from his hometown football school Olymp. He was dismissed from the club because of weak physical abilities. After that, he and his twin brother Aleksei moved to Lokomotiv Moscow.

Lokomotiv Moscow
On 30 October 2013, Miranchuk made his competitive debut in senior football in a Russian Cup game against Rotor Volgograd replacing Victor Obinna in the 88th minute.

Loan to Levadia
On 2 February 2016, Miranchuk was sent on loan to Estonian club Levadia Tallinn. He made his debut for the new team on 2 April 2016, in a 1–1 home draw with Nõmme Kalju. On 30 June 2016, Miranchuk made his debut in UEFA Europa League, in a 1–1 draw with Faroese side HB in a first qualifying round. By the end of 2016 Meistriliiga season, he scored 14 goals.

Return to Lokomotiv Moscow
Miranchuk made his debut in the Russian Premier League for Lokomotiv Moscow on 9 April 2017 in a game against FC Rostov. On 24 October 2018, he scored his first UEFA Champions League goal in a 3–1 home defeat against Porto in the 2018–19 season. On 27 October 2020, he scored a goal in a 1–2 home defeat against Bayern Munich in the 2020–21 UEFA Champions League. He scored again on 3 November against Atlético Madrid in the same competition.

International career
Miranchuk made his debut for Russia national football team on 7 October 2017 in a friendly game against South Korea.

On 11 May 2018, he was included in Russia's extended 2018 FIFA World Cup squad. On 3 June 2018, he was included in the finalized World Cup squad. He did not make any appearances at the tournament as Russia was eliminated by Croatia in the quarterfinal shoot-out.

Personal life 
He is the identical twin brother of Aleksei Miranchuk, who is also his teammate on the Russia national team.

Career statistics

Club

International

Scores and results list Russia's goal tally first, score column indicates score after each Miranchuk goal.

Honours
Lokomotiv Moscow
 Russian Premier League: 2017–18
 Russian Cup: 2018–19, 2020–21
 Russian Super Cup: 2019

References

External links

1995 births
People from Slavyansk-na-Kubani
Sportspeople from Krasnodar Krai
Russian twins
Twin sportspeople
Russian people of Ukrainian descent
Living people
Russian footballers
Russia youth international footballers
Russia under-21 international footballers
Russia international footballers
Association football midfielders
FC Lokomotiv Moscow players
FCI Levadia Tallinn players
Russian Premier League players
Meistriliiga players
2018 FIFA World Cup players
Russian expatriate footballers
Expatriate footballers in Estonia
Russian expatriate sportspeople in Estonia